The 1980 SMU Mustangs football team represented Southern Methodist University (SMU) as a member of the Southwest Conference (SWC) during the 1980 NCAA Division I-A football season. Led by fifth-year head coach Ron Meyer, the Mustangs compiled an overall record 8–4 with a mark of 5–3 in conference play, tying for second place in the SWC. SMU was invited to the Holiday Bowl, there they lost to BYU. The Mustangs finished the season ranked No. 20 in both major polls.

Schedule

Roster

Season summary

Texas

    
    
    
    
    
    

This game became notable for a significant change made during it. Coach Meyer, who had run a pro-style offense with Mike Ford to this point, chose instead to adjust and run an option attack with freshman Lance McIlhenny instead. The adjustment worked, as Texas could not stop what became known as the Mustangs’ “Pony Express” running game of Craig James and eventual NFL Hall of Famer Eric Dickerson.

Team players in the NFL

References

SMU
SMU Mustangs football seasons
SMU Mustangs football